Charles Raphael (Rafael in some sources) is a former U.S. soccer forward who earned one cap with the U.S. national team in 1988.  He played professionally for nine years.

Player

Youth
In 1978, Raphael's U-12 youth team won the Miami Junior Orange Bowl tournament which featured 96 teams from across North America.   He attended Bishop Ireton High School and attended George Mason University in 1988.

Professional
Raphael played at least the 1988 American Soccer League season with the Washington Stars.  In 1990, he rejoined the Stars, who now played in the American Professional Soccer League.  The team waived him on May 11, 1990.

National team
Raphael earned one cap with the U.S. national team.  The game was a 1-0 win over Costa Rica on June 14, 1988.  He was replaced by Steve Snow.

Coaching
In 2001, he became the head coach to the Patuxent High School girls soccer team.  Previously to that, he coached the Herndon High School girls team.   He also coaches youth soccer with the Calvert Soccer Association.THE BLITZ

References

George Mason Patriots men's soccer players
United States men's international soccer players
American Soccer League (1988–89) players
American Professional Soccer League players
Washington Stars players
American soccer coaches
Living people
American soccer players
Association football forwards
Year of birth missing (living people)